is a Japanese retired footballer.

Club career

Avispa Fukuoka
In June 2018, FC Tokyo loaned Yoshimoto to Avispa Fukuoka.

Shimizu S-Pulse
In July 2019, Yoshimoto signed with Shimizu S-Pulse. He retired in December 2020.

Club statistics
Updated to end of 2018 season.

Reserves performance

Last Updated: 3 March 2019

National team career statistics

Appearances in major competitions

References

External links
Profile at FC Tokyo

1988 births
Living people
Association football people from Tokyo Metropolis
People from Kodaira, Tokyo
Japanese footballers
J1 League players
J2 League players
J3 League players
FC Tokyo players
FC Tokyo U-23 players
FC Gifu players
Mito HollyHock players
Avispa Fukuoka players
Shimizu S-Pulse players
Association football defenders